Étienne Bertrand Weill (1919-2001) was a French photographer. His primary works were abstract Metaforms.

Early life 
Born in 1919 in Paris to an assimilated Jewish family, he is the son of Raphaël Weill and Jeanne Ullmann. He had an early interest in art, but decided to pursue photography because his older brother and two of his uncles, Louis Ullmann and Édouard Moyse (1827-1907), were already painters. He graduated from École nationale de Photographie et de cinéma Louis Lumière.

War period 
He joined the French Resistance in 1942, and used his drawing talents to forge identity papers in order to save children before enlisting in the maquis of the Éclaireurs ‎israélites de France. At the end of the war he joined the First army to fight in the Vosges and Alsace campaign. His mother was arrested in 1942 before being interned at Drancy internment camp and later deported to Sobibor extermination camp where she was killed in March 1943.

Early photographic career
After the conclusion of the war, he decided to pursue photography fulltime. His photographs during this period developed in various directions: he photographs architecture, art — becoming the main photographer of Jean Arp's works — and for a short period, experiments the humanist photography. These works are published in magazines — L’Architecture d‏’‏aujourd’hui, ‎directed by André Bloc, or Cahiers d’Art by Christian Zervos. He portrays artists (Jean-Paul Sartre, Eugène Ionesco, etc.), documents the life of workers (The Life of a Parisian Metalworker, the Brass Band of Renault, The Demonstration…)

During the war, he had met with Marcel Marceau who represented a milestone in his career, orienting him towards mime, theatre and ‎dance photography. He was the only photographer accepted by Étienne Decroux, ‎and also took pictures of Jean-Louis Barrault and Madeleine Renaud.

Metaforms, the mature work 
From the 1960s, with the Metaforms created, he becomes one of the masters of ‎abstract photography and takes his place in the kinetic art, one of the great trends of modern photography. He presents one of these early Metaforms in an exhibition organised by the Groupe Espace at Biot in 1957.

With these Metaforms, described as “music for the eyes” by Maurice Fleuret, he will ‎later imagine and elaborate kinetic suites accompanied by music. Neither music or the Metaform are illustrative, but both aim at creating a world free from reality. They will be part of various scenographies, poetic recitals, concert, dance and mime shows, projected, among other places, at Le Musée d‏’‏art moderne de la Ville de Paris. in 1971 and 1976, Le theatre de la Ville de Paris (where in 1971 one of his suites is the prelude to Hymnen, by Karlheinz Stockhausen, choreographed by Le Ballet contemporain, in a scenography by Gérard Fromanger), and also projected at Opéra de Paris and in many international festivals around the world.

He also directed an experimental short film, produced by Office de Radiodiffusion Télévision Française, Variations I & I. It was awarded a special mention at the Jerusalem’s Amateur and Short Film Festival.

From 1975 to 1986, he taught photography at Paris-Sorbonne University and was a member of the Plastic Arts Agregation jury.

Personal life 
In 1948, Etienne Bertrand Weill marries Jacqueline Weill and five daughters will be born. From 1987 onwards, the couple lived in Jerusalem, where he continued to work until his death in 2001.

Main posthumous exhibitions:‎ 
 2002 ‎ Hommage to Etienne Bertrand Weill, Suzanne Dellal center, Tel-Aviv, Israél 
 2005 ‎ Centre Culturel de la Visitation, Festival Mimos  Exhibition Etienne Decroux, photographies by Étienne Bertrand Weill, Périgueux
 2005  "L'œil moteur", art optique & cinétique, Musée d'Art Moderne et Contemporain (MAMCS) Strasbourg, France
 2008  Acteurs en scène, Bibliothèque nationale de France, Paris
 2008 "Etienne Bertrand Weill 1919-2001 - Lumières et Mouvements", Galerie Hautefeuille, Paris
 2012  Vertige du corp, BnF François-Mitterrand (The National Library of France), Paris
 2014  Maria Wettergren Gallery, Paris
 2015  La photographie française du xx century Pordenone, Italy
 2016  Maria Wettergren Gallery, "Trajets de Lumière", Paris
 2017  “Le Pouvoir du geste” Hommage to the mime Marcel Marceau
 2019  "Vers d’autre rives", Maria Wettergren Gallery, Paris
 2021  Noir & Blanc at Grand Palais,Paris

Main personal exhibitions 
 1956 ‎ Galerie d'Orsay, Paris Le monde du ‎théâtre 
 1957 ‎ First exhibition of a metaform with Le Groupe Espace
 1957 ‎ Librairie Al ferro di Cavallo, Rome, Italy 
 1957 ‎ Centre Français d'Etudes et ‎d'Information, Milan, Italy 
 1957  Galerie Lilienhof, Fribourg en Brisgau 
 1962 ‎ Maison des Beaux Arts, Paris: Métaformes,
 1962 	Université de Sarrebruck, Germany 
 1964 ‎ French Institute Köln, Germany 
 1964 ‎ Université de Sarrebruck, Germany
 1964 ‎ Salon d’Art Sacré: Magnificat, France
 1964 ‎ Alliance Française de Buenos-Ayres: ‘’Libre Expression”
 1964 ‎ Ambassade de France, Tel-Aviv, Israël 
 1966 ‎ Cloître de la Cathédrale de Vaison la Romaine, France
 1968 ‎ Semaine culturelle de Bolbec, Lillebonne & N.D. de Gravenchon, France 
 1969 ‎ Palais de l'Europe, Menton, France
 1971 ‎ Théâtre Récamier, Jean-Louis Barrault, Paris, France
 1972 Holstebro-Museum, Danemark 
 1973 ‎ Galerie Knoll, Nîmes, France 
 1973 	Festival de Collias, France
 1975 ‎ Inaugurations du Nouveau Centre des Arts et Loisirs du Vésinet, France
 1975 ‎ Ambassade de France, Tel-Aviv, Israël 
 1976 ‎ Galerie Saint Roch, France 
 1976 	Aéroport d'Orly, France
 1976 ‎ Galerie Lilienhof, Fribourg en Brisgau 
 1977 ‎ C.A.E.S.-C.N.R.S. Meudon-Bellevue, France
 1978 ‎ Ambassade de France, New-York 
 1978 ‎ Musée Guimet, Paris, France
 1978 ‎ Musée de Poitiers, France
 1980 ‎ Musée des Beaux Arts, Besançon, France
 1980-1982 Universités américaines de Georgie, de Murcie, du Kansas, de Pennsylvanie, de l'Etat de New-York. 
 1980-1982 Centres Culturels du Maine, de Caroline ‎du Nord, de Californie et du Wisconsin. 
 1983 ‎ “Le mime Etienne Decroux et son École", Métaformes, Cinémathèque de Montréal.
 1978 ‎ Théâtre de Winnipeg, Canada 
 1989 ‎ Théâtre de Chicago (mime & theatre) 
 1993 ‎ Festival du Movement Theatre International & Esther Klein Gallery, Philadelphia

Main collective exhibitions 
 1946 to 1959 E.B. Weill participated in all "salons nationaux et internationaux du Cabinet des Estampes" (Bibliothèque Nationale) & in "the salons la Société Française de Photographie"
 1949  IVth Salon National de la Photographie
 1950  Vth Salon National de la Photographie, 
 1950  37th Salon International d’Art Photographique
 1950  Société Française de Photographie
 1951  39th Salon International d’Art Photographique
 1951  Société Française de Photographie
 1951  VIth Salon National de la Photographie
 1953  VIIIth Salon National de la Photographie
 1953  36th Salon des Artistes Décorateurs
 1954  37th Salon des Artistes Décorateurs
 1955  Xth Salon National de la photographie
 1956  XIth Salon National de la Photographie
 1957  Salon International de Bièvres
 1958  Collective Exhibition with Groupe Espace, Biot.
 1958  Librairie Galerie Eliane Norberg, Paris Masques & Photographies avec Thérèse Le Prat & Nina Vidrovitch
 1959  IIIth Biennale Internationale du Centre National de la Photographie
 1963  “Laboratoire des Arts`’, participation à l’équipe dirigée par Jean-Louis Renucci, 
 1963  Premier prix de la Biennale de Paris
 1965  Expressions photographiques 65 
 1965  Groupe Libre expression
 1966  Salon d’Art Sacré 
 1966  Interpress-Photo 66, International Exhibition, Moscou
 1966  Alliance Française de Buenos-Ayres, Libre Expression 
 1966  International exhibition of pictorial photography, Édimbourg 
 1967  Kinetic Art Exhibition, organised by Frank Popper at Musée d’Art Moderne de la Ville de Paris
 1968  Third Festival de la Photographie, Besançon
 1968  Cinétisme, Spectacle, environnement, Grenoble
 1968  24 heures de l’image, Exhibition with "Gens d’images" Théâtre de l’Ouest Parisien, Boulogne
 1969  Espace et Lumière, Exhibition by "la Société des Artistes Décorateurs", Grand Palais, Paris
 1969  Salon des Artistes Décorateurs Le vent se lève
 1970  Project of groupe ‘’Laboratoire des Arts’’ group for the Pavillon Français in Osaka
 1970  Européan Festival - l’image photographique, Pau octobre 70
 1970  Le Dynamisme, Fist french salon franco-belge, Werwicq-sud
 1971  Exhibition of scénographies with the Ballet Théâtre Contemporain, Grenoble, Angers, Rennes, Reims & 8 countries of south America 
 1971  IIth Salon FrancoBelge
 1971-72  Itinérant Exhibition organised by Valentine Faugère at Nairobie (Kenya), Blantyre (Malawi), Dar es Salam (Tanzanie), Accra (Ghana), Cotonou (Bénin), Lomé (Togo), Tananarive (Madagascar)
 1973 Xth Festival d’Art contemporain de Royan
 1975 Espace et Lumière, Aspects of photographique research
 1975 “Les peintres Musicalistes", Galery Hexagramme, Paris, itinérant Exhibition in Australia, Nouvelle Calédonie, Ile Maurice, Malawi, Dahomey
 1975  Biennale du Noir et Blanc, La Garenne Colombes
 1976  Biennale of Ibizza
 1976  "Paris de rêves"
 1976  Exhibition Nationales in Biot
 1977  Festival de Théâtre Musical de Poitiers «L'espace et les Espaces" 
 1977  Festival Européen de l’image photographique, Pau du 17 au 25 octobre
 1977  Inauguration du Centre Georges Pompidou
 1979  Les photographes de l’Imaginaire", Palais de la Découverte, Paris
 1979  Palazzo dell’Arte, Milano, Panorama della fotografia francese, Club des 30x40
 1979  Paris Libre Expression V
 1982  Une autre photographie", Maison des Arts, Créteil
 1983  Salon des Photographes professionnels, Porte de Versailles
 1984  La photographie créative", Pavillon des Arts au Forum des Halles
 1985-87 Le Bougé``, Edimbourg, Londres, Musée de Beaune, Australie
 1987  Le temps d’un mouvement``, Musée d’Art Moderne, Paris
 1999  Exhibition Renaud Barrault in the Galerie de l'Hôtel de Ville 
 1999  Exhibition Poliéri

Main concert shows 
 1964‎ Variations I & II’, métaformes d’Etienne Bertrand Weill, music by Gilbert Amy, film 16 mm, produced by le Service de la Recherche de l’ORTF.
 1964‎ Projection for Variations Centre Culturel in Royaumont & the French Institute Köln 
 1965‎ Théâtre du Vieux Colombier Paris, poétic evening by Bernard Mermod & new création of ‘’Bateau Ivre‘’, Arthur Rimbaud poèm.
 1965‎ French Institute Sarrebruck: Variation I & II & Bateau Ivre,
 1965‎ Festival de Vaison la Romaine, projections for Sol de Compiègne’, Robert Desnos poem.	
 1966‎ Fribourg en Brisgau University, Projections for "la Ballade de l`Etranger", mimodrame by Charles Bensoussan	
 1968‎ Centre International de Séjour, Paris, projections of Anaklasis, music by Penderecki 
 1969‎ Palais de l’Europe in Menton, création de la Fête des Belles Eaux, Projections with music by Olivier Messian, Adagio - Bela Bartok music
 1969‎ "Théâtre de la Musique", Paris, collaboration with Jacques Noël, projections for "Bip ‎dans la vie moderne et future" by Marcel Marceau	
 1970‎ Xth Festival International de l’Image, Epinal: Grand prix Leitz France pour Adagio
 1970‎ Maison de la Culture de Grenoble: prélude wih projections for Hymnen, music by Stockhausen danced by le Ballet Théâtre Contemporain	
 1971‎ Théâtre de la Ville, Paris, Hymnen, projections on a 40 meter screen this Performance was presented in many cultural centers in France & in South America
 1971‎ Musical International weeks of Paris, new creation of Dorian Horizon, with Toru Taqkemitsu music
 1971‎ ‘’Music for the Eyes’’, présented by Maurice Fleuret at l’ARC, Musée de la Ville ‎de Paris
 1972‎‎ Holstebro-Museum, Danemark: ‘’Music for the Eyes’’
 1972‎ Graphexpo, Paris, Projections in an inflatable structure	
 1973‎ Festival de Collias: concert-spectacle with the Trio Deslogéres, ‘’Vision des Temps Immémoriaux’’, music by Antoine Tisné & d’un mouvement du ‘’Quatuor pour la Fin du Temps’’, music by Olivier Messian		
 1974‎ Rencontre Internationales d’Arles, concert-spectacle avec le Trio Deslogères, creation of Tarquinia, music by Charles Chaysnes
 1974‎ Festival d’Amboise, création de ‘’Rondo Mobile’’, music by Marcel Goldmann, chorégraphie d’Alain Davesne
 1974‎ Festival Estival de Paris: ‘’Music for the Eyes’’
 1975‎ Théâtre des Champs Elysées projections for "Bip dans la Vie moderne et future", by Marcel Marceau 
 1976‎ Musée d’Art Moderne de la Ville de Paris: Nouvelle soirée ‘’Music for the Eyes’’, création of Rhétos, music by Hubert Stuppner & Chtaslivi, Music by Solange Ancona, dance Muriel Jaër
 1977‎ concerts-spectacles with the Trio Deslogères in Israël: Tel-Aviv Museum & Jérusalem University 
 1977‎ Centre Culturel de Chatillon sous Bagneux: Nouvelle soirée ’’Music for the Eyes’’, new création of Trio en Quatorze Variations, music by Beethoven
 1977‎ Musée Guimet, in a concert with the ACIC, présentation of Chtaslivi & Dorian Horizon
 1977‎ Centre Mandapa, Paris:’’Dance, Resonnance’’ Four evenings with dance & projections with Muriel Jaër
 1977‎ Festival du Théâtre Musical in Poitiers: spectacle Muriel Jaër & Etienne Bertrand Weill 
 1977‎ Third ‘’Bolzano Festival’’, Italy & second Autumn Musical in Como, Italy 
 1978‎ Projections for "L’Amour Sorcier", musique de Manuel de Falla, chorégraphie de Raphaël Agilar présented at Maison de la Culture d’Amiens, in Germany, Hollande & Austria
 1978‎ International musical weeks, Orléans "Music for the Eyes"` with Trio Deslogères & Muriel Jaër 	
 1979‎ Diachronies For the "Ballet National de l’Opéra", music Béla Bartok, chorégraphie de Janine Charrat, scénographie images et costumes d’Etienne Bertrand ‎Weill. 	
 1981‎ Centre Culturel du Soleil d’Or, Paris: Spectacle-Dance, projections with Muriel Jaër by Etienne ‎Bertrand Weill, Chant Silencieux
 1981‎ International Musical weeks at Orléans; music, dance & projections with Muriel Jaër, the Trio Deslogères & Etienne Bertrand Weill: Prélude en silence, Hymnen, Rhétos, Tarquinia, Chtaslivi
 1982‎ ‘’Shadow of a Mind’’, projections for mime performance by T. Daniel, Chicago
 1982‎ Projections for ‘’Combat dans les Ténèbres’’ by Marcel Marceau at Théâtre des Champs Elysées, Paris
 1982‎ Festival International de l’Avant-garde, FIAG, Paris
 1982‎ ‘’Heures musicales de Vernon’’, concert spectacle with le Trio Deslogères, new création: Tarquinia ( 2th mouvement) 
 1982‎ Festival: ‘’Trente années de Cinéma Expérimental en France’’, projection de ’’Variations I & II’’ at Centre Pompidou, Paris, Lyon, Lille, Montréal
 1983‎ "Shadow of a Mind" presented at Istanbul Festival International & at Lubliana
 1984‎ ‘’Future Shokk’’ at Winnipeg, images & scénographie for a spectacle by Giuseppe Condello 
 1985‎ ‘’Interférences’’, visual & musical research with Marie-Françoise Lacaze ‎at Colloque International ‘’Corps, Espace, Temps’’ Marly-le-Roi
 1990‎ Théâtre de Jérusalem theater, 22 march: Tsoar 
 1991‎ Pau (France): Interférence, Penderecki, Zeloa Music by M.F. Lacaze
 1992‎ Habama, at Jerusalem: Penderecki, Alliance Française at Jerusalem shows with music by Bartok, Penderecki, Bethoven 	
 1994‎ Auditorium of Israël Museum, Jérusalem: ’’Music for the Eyes’’
 1998‎ ‘’Tsaadim’’: Choreography & dance Tamara Mielnick, Music Steve Peskoff, Visual Création by Etienne Bertrand Weill, (five shows at Gérard ‎Behar in Jérusalem)
 1999‎ Six performances of "Tsaadim" in Jérusalem & two at Suzanne Dellal center Tel Aviv

Bibliography 

 Jean Hermann, Les Métaformes d’Etienne Bertrand Weill, Jeune photographie N° 58, January 1958.
 E.B.Weill, Les Métaformes, Aujourd’hui, art et architecture, N° 35, February 1962.
 Jacques Michel, Réalités invisibles, Le Monde, 30 March 1962.
 H.Galy-Carles, Weill Aujourd’hui, art et architecture, N° 37, April 1962.
 Jean Arp "Un Commerce de Lumières forgé avec le Surnaturel", publié dans ‘’Jours Effeuillés’’ N.R.F. Paris 1966, page 157.
 Baum und Zeit im Bild vereint, Badishe Volkeszeitung, 8 April 1965.
 Michel F. Braive: La photographie dans le mouvement artistique actuel Connaissance des Arts, Paris, November 1965.
 Frank Popper, Naissance de l’Art Cinétique, page 45.Editions Gautier Villars, Paris, 1967, 
 Frank Popper, Les Métaformes d’Etienne Bertrand Weill, Plaisir de France, N° 44, June 1969.
 Métaformes & kinetic suites, XVth birthday of Gens d’Images, 1969.
 Jean Claude Gautrand, Etienne Bertrand Weill, sculpteur de lumière, Photo Tribune N° 1, 1970.
 Léon Abramovicz, Etienne Bertrand Weill, Métaformes, Tribune Juive, March 1971.
 Charles Dobzinski, Le monde inconnu de Métaformes, Les Lettres Françaises, N° 1419, 19 January 1972.
 Entretien avec Etienne Bertrand Weill 1969, publié à l’occasion de Graphexpo 1972.
 Etienne Bertrand Weill; Images of trajectories of mobiles by means of photographs and cinema:
 Metaforms, Leonardo, pp. 301-306, Vol. 5, Pergamon Press Oxford, New_York 1972
 
 Regards sur la photographie créative française, Photographie Nouvelle, N° 59, 1972, Paris.
 Roberto A. Salbitani: Etienne Bertrand Weill, Progresso Photographico, Milan N° 4, April 1974.
 Gilbert Béville, Les Métaformes d’Etienne Bertrand Weill Revue Française de l’Electricité, N° 252, 1976.
 E.B.Weill, Intervention au sujet du film d’Agam au Colloque des Intellectuels Juifs de langue française, ‘’Le modèle de l’Occident’’, actes du Colloque, 1976.
 Martine Voyeux: La photo spectacle, interview d’Etienne Bertrand Weill, Photocinéma, N° 72, October 1978.
 Joëlle Naïm, Etienne Bertrand Weill, L’Arche, N° 517, March 2001
 Lapelletrie Fabrice: Diplôme d'études d'Art, 2010
 Lapelletrie Fabrice: Le spectacle musical de Métaformes. Revue d’Histoire de l’Art, Paris N° 62

References 

1919 births
2001 deaths
Jews in the French resistance
20th-century French photographers
Photographers from Paris
French abstract artists
Kinetic art
Jewish artists
French Army personnel of World War II
Academic staff of Paris-Sorbonne University
Artists from Jerusalem
21st-century French photographers